Ky Robinson (born February 27, 2002) is an Australian long-distance runner. 

Robinson competed in the 10,000m at the 2022 Commonwealth Games, placing sixth in a time of 27:44.33.

Prep Career 
Robinson started training for athletics when he was 15. In 2018 Robinson placed fourth in Australian U18 cross country championships. He finished in third the next year. In 2019 he won three Queensland U18 titles in the 1500m, 3000m, and the 2,000m steeplechase. That same year he won The Great Public Schools Association of Queensland cross country championship in 2019 by running 18:12 in the 6 kilometer race.

Collegiate Career 
Robinson ran at Stanford University in California along side notable teammates such as Charles Hicks, Cole Sprout and D.J. Principe.

Freshman Year (2020-21)

His freshman year he immediately made an impact by being the No.3 runner on Standford 5th place cross country team. During track season he broke the school record in the steeplechase by running 8:32.01 at the 2021 NCAA Outdoor Championships where he finished 6th overall. He was also third in the steeplechase at the Pac-12 Championships. When the season was over he had broken the Australia and Oceania U20 record in the steeplechase twice.

Sophomore Year (2021-22)

In his second season of cross country he placed 14th at NCAA Championships where the Cardinal once again finished 5th. That Indoor season he made a splash early on broking the Dempsey Indoor record in the 5,000m by 13:21.85 to win the Husky Classic. He finished the indoor season with a second place finish in the 5,000m at the NCAA Indoor Championships running 13:20.17. Outdoors, he was the Pac-12 runner-up in the steeplechase and placed third in the 5,000m before finishing fourth in the 5,000m at the NCAA Outdoor Championships running a 13:30.23.

Junior Year (2022-23)

Robinson Made his season cross county debut at the Nuttycombe Wisconsin Invitational where to out-kicked Northern Arizona's Nico Young to win in the 8k in 23:09.9. He then went on the finish 10th at NCAA's.

International Competitions 
Robinson first represented Australia at the 2022 World Athletics Championships in Eugene, Oregon. He placed 8th in his head and did not advance. Later that summer he competed for Australia at the Commonwealth Games where he placed 6th overall in the 10,000m running 27:44.33.

Championship record

References

External links 
 Ky Robinson World Athletics Profile

2002 births
Living people
Australian male long-distance runners
21st-century Australian people
Stanford Cardinal men's track and field athletes
Athletes (track and field) at the 2022 Commonwealth Games
Commonwealth Games competitors for Australia